A Schlenk-frit is a laboratory filtration device operating under inert gas conditions (schlenk conditions). It separates air- and water-sensitive suspensions into liquid and solid parts. A Schlenk-frit is made of a glass tube with a ground glass joint at both ends, a fused filter (a porous glass disk) and valves at both sides.

Use 

Before usage, the Schlenk-frit has to be heated, to remove water traces. The Schlenk-frit is put onto the product flask using an inert gas counterflow and closed at the top end with a second flask. The whole is turned 180° to start filtration. The liquid parts of the reaction mix go through the filter while the solid parts remain. 

To speed up the filtration pressure can be lowered at the bottom part of the filter. Care has to be taken that the solvent does not evaporate.

References 

Laboratory equipment